Susan Kingsley was an American actress, with roles in films such as Popeye (1980), Steel (1979) and Coal Miner's Daughter (1980).

Early life and education

Kingsley studied drama at the University of Kentucky and at the London Academy of Music and Dramatic Art.

Career

Kingsley was a member of Actors Theatre of Louisville, where she appeared in the main role of Marsha Norman's play Getting Out.

She also played the role of Marshael Foster in the Broadway play The Wake of Jamey Foster in October 1982. 

Kingsley appeared in films including Coal Miner's Daughter, Popeye, Reckless, Steel, Old Enough, Sunshine On the Way, and The Dollmaker.

Death

On February 6, 1984, as Kingsley was returning to Louisville, Kentucky in order to rehearse a play at Actors Theater, after a vacation in Florida, she was involved in an automobile accident near Commerce, Georgia.  The injuries she suffered from the accident led to her death.  She is buried at Roselawn Memorial Gardens in Middlesboro, Kentucky,  and was survived by her husband David Hurt, and two children.

References

External links
 
 
 Susan Kingsley at Internet Off-Broadway Database

1946 births
1984 deaths
20th-century American actresses